Pandua may refer to:
 Pandu (actor) (1947–2021), a Tamil film actor
 Pandua (community development block), Hooghly District, West Bengal
 Pandua (Vidhan Sabha constituency), Hooghly District, West Bengal
 Pandua, Malda, now known as Adina, ruins of a historic town in Malda district, West Bengal, India.
 Pandua, Hooghly, Hooghly District, West Bengal, India